The Seed of Love is an upcoming Philippine television drama series to be broadcast by GMA Network. Directed by Ricky Davao, it stars Glaiza de Castro. It is set to premiere in 2023, on the network's Afternoon Prime lineup.

Premise
A husband and wife tackle the challenges of going through the process of an in-vitro fertilization.

Cast and characters
Lead cast
 Glaiza de Castro as Eileen

Supporting cast
 Valerie Concepcion as Alexa
 Mike Tan as Bobby
 Boy2 Quizon
 Tina Paner
 Bernadette Allyson
 Ervic Vijandre
 Yana Asistio
 Ashley Rivera
 Allan Paule

Production
Principal photography commenced in March 2020 in Banaue, Ifugao. Filming was halted in March 2020 due to the enhanced community quarantine in Luzon caused by the COVID-19 pandemic. Filming was continued in September 2022.

References

Filipino-language television shows
GMA Network drama series
Television productions postponed due to the COVID-19 pandemic
Television shows set in the Philippines
Upcoming drama television series